Yergüc (also, Yergyudzh) is an abandoned village in the mountainous western part of Quba Rayon, Azerbaijan. There were seven clans. However, the people have long since moved to more accessible locations. Some of its former population still speak their own dialect, one of the Shahdag village languages related to that of nearby Buduq. The main concentration of Yergüc people is in the village of the same name in Xaçmaz Rayon though they are also to be found in that region's villages of Sərkərli, Armudpadar, Hacıəlibəy and Uzunoba along with others in Davudoba of Quba Rayon. 

The folk-poet Aşıq Əbdüləziz hailed from Yergüc.

References 

Populated places in Quba District (Azerbaijan)